"Captain" Kirk Douglas (born September 30, 1973) is an American guitarist and singer who performs with the hip hop band The Roots.  He joined The Roots in 2003.  His first album with The Roots was 2004's The Tipping Point, where he split guitar duties with Martin Luther and Anthony Tidd.  By the release of their 2006 album Game Theory, he had assumed the role as sole guitarist for the band.  As a vocalist, he serves as the band's primary melodic singer, sharing duties with American rapper Black Thought.

Equipment

Guitars
On The Tonight Show Starring Jimmy Fallon, Douglas mainly uses a Gibson CS-356, a black custom Gibson Les Paul, or a custom Gibson SG. He owns more than fifteen electric guitars, including a Gibson Goldtop (given to him by Vernon Reid), a Gibson Dusk Tiger and his favorite: a '61 Epiphone Crestwood. In 2013, Gibson began producing the "Captain Kirk" Custom SG. He also owns an acoustic Gibson J-200 and a Gibson Hummingbird. In honor of what would have been Roy Orbison's 75th birthday, Kirk played Orbison's signature Gibson ES-335 on Late Night with Jimmy Fallon, April 25, 2011.

The Crestwood had its headstock broken in March 2013 when Prince threw it in the air following his performance of "Bambi" on Late Night with Jimmy Fallon. Prince had admired the guitar (which Douglas had planned to play at a Prince tribute concert) and asked to borrow it for his performance. Douglas said, "Right after this happened I went right into the control room and he was there and he apologized and he said he would take care of it."

References

American rhythm and blues guitarists
American male guitarists
American rock guitarists
Guitarists from Pennsylvania
The Roots members
The Tonight Show Band members
Living people
1973 births